The Wolf Plains Group is a Late Adena culture group of 30 earthworks including 22 conical mounds and nine circular enclosures. The Plains, originally known as Wolf's Plains, located a few miles to the northwest of Athens, is a relatively flat terrace in an area of hilly terrain in southeastern Ohio's Hocking River valley. The terrace was formed by glacial outwash coming down the Hocking River, which became dammed at The Plains and found a new outlet to the northeast, leaving the terrace in place.

The Wolf Plains Group was featured in Ephraim George Squier and Edwin Hamilton Davis's landmark publication Ancient Monuments of the Mississippi Valley (1848). Their finished drawing was based on a sketch from 1836 by S. P. Hildreth, and contains some inaccuracies. Some of the clusters of mounds are rotated relative to their actual position, some are missing, and some are misplaced. In 2008 The Archaeological Conservancy purchased the site of one of the remaining earthworks, the Dorr 2 Mound, using emergency POINT funds; and it plans to purchase more as funds become available. The majority of the remaining earthworks in the complex are privately owned and are threatened with destruction as The Plains community expands. The Wolf Plains Group was added to the National Register of Historic Places on May 31, 1974; at that time, 25 earthworks remained in good enough condition to qualify as contributing properties.

See also
 Newark Earthworks

References

External links

1836 archaeological discoveries
Adena culture
Archaeological sites in Ohio
National Register of Historic Places in Athens County, Ohio
Historic districts on the National Register of Historic Places in Ohio
Archaeological sites on the National Register of Historic Places in Ohio
Mounds in Ohio